There is Some Fun Going Forward is the only sampler album released by John Peel's Dandelion Records label, and was marketed by Polydor. As one might expect from Peel, the artists featured were not necessarily mainstream, and in fact, the only artists featured who enjoyed chart success are Clifford T. Ward and Medicine Head. The sleeve featured a photo of Peel in the bath with a naked (or at least visibly topless) woman. It was re-released in 1995 by See For Miles as a CD with extra tracks.

Track listing

Side One

Side Two

Extra tracks on CD rerelease

References

Full discography with rereleases
Amazon listing
Elektra connection

Sampler albums
1972 compilation albums
Folk rock compilation albums
Progressive rock compilation albums
John Peel albums
Dandelion Records albums
See for Miles Records albums